Konotop is a city in Sumy Oblast, northeastern Ukraine. Konotop serves as the administrative center of Konotop Raion. It is host to Konotop Air Base, now held by Ukraine. The population is

History 
During the beginning of the 17th century, Cossacks were first based in that area. The settlement was first mentioned in 1634 in various documents as Novoselytsia. In 1642 a Polish fortress was built in that place named after the river Konotopka. Probably the river disappeared, and another one was created, Yezuch. The fortification became a key point in the struggle against the Moscow state. 

Another hypothesis is that the name of the city could originate from the name of the ancient Warmian knyaz (князь) Christopher of Kononowitz of the noble Polish-Belarusian-Lithuanian family Kononowicz-Piłsudski that still exists and uses the Polish coat of arms of Radwan. The name "Konotop" would then mean “the place of Kono(nowitz)” from adjoining the suffix topos (cf. Ancient Greek τόπος) meaning place or location.

In 1659 the Battle of Konotop took place near the city, in which Cossacks led by Ivan Vyhovsky (allied with Poles and Crimean Tatars) defeated Muscovite forces. In 1782 Konotop was granted municipal rights.

During World War II, Konotop was occupied by the German Army from 3 September 1941 to 6 September 1943. Details of this are recounted in the book The Forgotten Soldier by Guy Sajer. The Germans operated a Nazi prison and the Stalag 310 prisoner-of-war camp in the city.

2022 Russian invasion of Ukraine

On February 25, 2022, during the 2022 Russian invasion of Ukraine, the city was reported to be under siege by Russian forces on their way to Kyiv. Ukraine later stated that it had lost control of the city. The mayor Artem Seminikhin stated on 2 March that Russian troops who had entered the city had warned him that they would destroy the city if the residents resisted them. An agreement was reached under which Russian forces accepted not to change the city's government or deploy troops, in return for which the residents would not attack them. On 3 April, Ukrainian MP Oleksandr Kachura stated on Twitter that all Russian forces had left Konotop Raion. On 4 April 2022 Sumy Oblast's Governor Dmytro Zhyvytskyi stated that Russian troops no longer occupied any towns or villages in Sumy Oblast and had mostly withdrawn, while Ukrainian troops were working to push out the remaining units.

Economy 
The main industrial enterprises of the city include the Konotop Casting and Mechanical Plant, the Motordetal Plant, the Konotop Fittings Plant, the Konotop Car Repair Plant, the Aviakon Aircraft Repair Plant, a mechanical plant, a garment factory, a meat processing plant (Konotopmyaso OJSC), a dairy plant, and a bakery plant. Konotop is an important mechanical engineering center, food production center.

Transport 
The city is an important transportation center. Various railroad connections from Konotop include: Moscow–Kyiv, Simferopol–Minsk, Bakhmach–Kyiv, Bryansk–Sumy/Belgorod. Furthermore, Konotop is one of the smallest cities in the country with its own tram system.

Notable people
Bernard Meninsky, artist

Climate

Gallery

References

External links 

  Official website
 JewUa.org – History of Jewish Community in Konotop

 
Cities in Sumy Oblast
Konotopsky Uyezd
Chernihiv Voivodeship
Cities of regional significance in Ukraine